Philip Hahn (1884-August 4, 1976) was an American actor. He was in silent films including the lead role in The Price He Paid, an adaptation of an Ella Wheeler Wilcox poem, and The Dancer's Peril. According to Motography he was a painter in Amsterdam until he went color blind.

Filmography
The Price He Paid (1914)
The Nightingale (1914 film)
The Garden of Lies (1915)
The Senator (1915) as Count Ernst von Strahl in the film adaptation
The Bachelor's Romance (1915)
The Woman's Law (1916)
The Scarlet Oath (1916) also titled The Other Sister
Playing with Fire (1916 film)
The Dancer's Peril (1917), as Grand Duke Alexis

References

External links
Philip Hahn Internet Movie Database
Philip HahnIBDb

1884 births
1976 deaths
20th-century American painters
20th-century American male actors
Year of birth missing